Kafr Dan is a Palestinian village in the Jenin Governorate, located 8 km northwest of Jenin in the northern West Bank. According to the Palestinian Central Bureau of Statistics (PCBS) census, the town had a population of  5,148 in 2007.

Location
Kafr Dan is located north-west of Jenin;  just east of Al-Yamun and north of Burqin.

History
Pottery remains from the Roman, Byzantine, Early Islamic periods and the Middle Ages have been found here.

Palmer suggested to identify Kafr Dan with Capher Outheni, a village mentioned in the Talmud.

Ottoman era
It had a population of 9 households, all Muslim. They paid a fixed tax rate of 25% on agricultural products, including wheat, barley, summer crops, olive trees, goats and beehives, in addition to  occasional revenues; a total of  6,000 akçe. Pottery remains from the Ottoman era have also been found here.

In 1838 Edward Robinson, calling it Kefr Adan, noted it  among many other villages on the plain; Lajjun, Umm al-Fahm, Ti'inik, Silat al-Harithiya, Al-Yamun and el Barid,   located in the District of Jenin, also called Haritheh esh-Shemaliyeh.

In 1870 Victor Guérin found at Kafr Dan “a broken column and a certain number of cut stones of ancient appearance.” 
Guérin estimated that the village had 300 inhabitants.

In 1882 the PEF’s Survey of Western Palestine described the area as a "village of moderate size on the slope of the hills, built of stone, with olives below, and a well on the west.” They called the village “Kefr Adan”.

British Mandate  era
In the 1922 census of Palestine, conducted  by the British Mandate authorities, Kufr Dan had a population of 486; all Muslims, increasing in  the 1931 census to  603,  still all Muslim, in a total of  135  houses.

In  the 1945 statistics, the population was 850, all Muslims, with 7,328 dunams of land, according to an official land and population survey.  5 dunams were used for citrus and bananas, 2,680  for plantations and irrigable land, 3,799 for cereals, while 34 dunams were built-up (urban) land.

Jordanian era
In the wake of the 1948 Arab–Israeli War, and after the 1949 Armistice Agreements, Kafr Dan  came  under Jordanian rule.

The Jordanian census of 1961 found 1,262 inhabitants.

Post 1967
Since the Six-Day War in 1967, Kafr Dan has been under Israeli occupation.

In 2009, Kafr Dan Village Council was upgraded into a municipality. The mayor, Bilal Mer'i, joined with Prime Minister Rami Hamdullah for the ceremony.

References

Bibliography

External links
Welcome to Kafr Dan
Survey of Western Palestine, Map 8: IAA, Wikimedia commons 

Towns in the West Bank
Jenin Governorate
Municipalities of the State of Palestine